Alessandro Benetton (born 2 March 1964) is an Italian businessman.

He served as Chairman of the Benetton Group from April 2012 to May 2014.

Early life
Alessandro Benetton is the son of Luciano Benetton and Maria Teresa Maestri. He attended university in the United States where he graduated from Boston University in 1987 with a degree in Business Administration and in 1991 received his Master of Business Administration from Harvard.

Career
In 1992, Alessandro Benetton created 21 Investimenti S.p.A.   (the company changed its name in 21 invest in November 2018). Today the European Group has offices in Treviso, Milan, Paris and Warsaw. He is one of the pioneers of private equity in Italy. Some of the companies that have been successfully relaunched are Pittarosso and The Space Cinema.

Benetton served as Chairman of the Benetton Formula from 1988 to 1998. His chairmanship years were marked by Formula One victories (26 out of the team's total 27), including two world titles won with Michael Schumacher in 1994 and 1995, a manufacturing victory in 1995, and a collaboration with Nelson Piquet, Jean Alesi, Riccardo Patrese, Alessandro Nannini.

From 1988 to 1989, he worked in the Global Finance department at Goldman Sachs International in London as an analyst in the Mergers and Acquisitions and Equity Offering sectors.

In 2012, Luciano Benetton handed over the chairmanship of the Benetton Group to his eldest son Alessandro. He later chaired the company for two years, from 2012 to 2014.

Also in 2016, Alessandro Benetton stepped down from Benetton Group Board of directors, due to differences with the company's new strategies.

In May 2022, he published "La Traiettoria", an autobiography about his professional career and the choices he made during his life.

In January 2023 he was appointed Vice Chairman of Atlantia.

Other positions held
He was a member of the Advisory Committee of Robert Bosch International Beteiligungen AG in Zurich, the consultancy unit of the Swiss holding for the foreign activities of the Bosch Group. Following an agreement between Edizione and Dufry, in 2022 he became Honorary Chairman of Autogrill S.p.A.   He was President of Cortina Foundation 2021, the entity responsible for the organization of the FIS Alpine World Ski Championship scheduled in Cortina d’Ampezzo (BL) for January 2021.

In January 2022, Alessandro Benetton took on the role of Chairman of Edizione, which became an S.p.A. company.

In November 2022, he joined the Parthenope University of Naples' Board of Directors.

Personal life
He has been married for 13 years to former Olympic and Alpine World Ski champion Deborah Compagnoni, with whom he has three children: Agnese, Tobias and Luce. He is involved in a variety of sports at a competitive level, particularly Alpine skiing - where he is a coach for the Italian Winter Sports Federation - and kite surfing. He is a collector of modern art.

Honors
In 2010, he was appointed Cavaliere del Lavoro by the President of the Italian Republic at the time, Giorgio Napolitano.

In 2016, he received the America Award of the Italy-USA Foundation.

Awards
In 2012, he sponsored United Colors of Benetton's UnHate communication campaign, winner of the Press Grand Prix at Cannes Lions International Festival of Creativity.

In 2011, he was named Entrepreneur of the Year by EY.

Publications

External links 
 Deborah Compagnoni
 Benetton Group
 Luciano Benetton
 Gilberto Benetton

References 

Italian businesspeople
1964 births
Living people
Boston University School of Management alumni
Harvard Business School alumni
Alessandro
Goldman Sachs people
Formula One team owners
Italian expatriates in the United States
Italian motorsport people
Benetton Formula